A general medical journal is an academic journal dedicated to medicine in general, rather than a specific field of medicine.

History
The first English-language general medical journal was Medicina Curiosa, which was established in 1684 and ceased publication after only two issues. Among the oldest general medical journals that are still published today are the Lancet, which was established in 1823, and the New England Journal of Medicine, which was established in 1812. In 1999, Medscape launched Medscape General Medicine, the world's first online-only general medical journal.

Examples
Journals that are considered general medical journals include the Lancet, the New England Journal of Medicine, and the Annals of Internal Medicine. In 2009, the three highest-ranked general medical journals by impact factor were JAMA, the Lancet, and the New England Journal of Medicine. The BMJs web editor, Tony Delamothe, has described the BMJ as a general medical journal. The Medical Journal of Australia is the only general medical journal in Australia, and the Canadian Medical Association Journal has been called the leading general medical journal in Canada.

References

General medical journals
Medical literature